Andrew Messenger (1650 – October 1730) was a deputy of the General Assembly of the Colony of Connecticut from Norwalk in the sessions of May 1691, and October 1696, and a member of the Connecticut House of Representatives in the sessions of October 1700, October 1701, and May 1702.

He was the son of Andrew Messenger and Rachel Manning.

On June 28, 1686, he bought the land of Walter Hoyt.

On December 5, 1694, Messenger was elected by the town of Norwalk, to serve as collector of each townsman's proportion (tax) to pay the minister for his services.

In 1698, it was the special duty of Messenger and John Keeler, as deputies to bring the enforcement of the Game Law to the attention of the native people of the Norwalk area, who had been assigned to the portion of Chestnut Hill called Indian Field.

References 

1650 births
1730 deaths
Deputies of the Connecticut General Assembly (1662–1698)
Members of the Connecticut House of Representatives
People from Jamaica, Queens
Politicians from Norwalk, Connecticut
People of colonial Connecticut
People of the Province of New York